The BM 59 is an automatic battle rifle developed in Italy in 1959. It is based on the M1 Garand rifle, chambered in 7.62×51mm NATO, modified to use a detachable magazine, and capable of selective fire. Later revisions incorporated other features common to more modern rifles.

Development
After World War II, Italy adopted the US-designed M1 Garand rifle in .30-06 Springfield (7.62×63mm) and also manufactured it under license. This semi-automatic rifle proved itself well during World War II, but in the late 1950s it was considered outdated and obsolete and the Italian military also wanted a new rifle chambered for the NATO-standard 7.62×51mm round.

To meet these requirements, Beretta designed the BM 59, which was essentially a rechambered M1 fitted with a removable 20-round magazine, folding bipod and a combined muzzle brake/flash suppressor/rifle grenade launcher. The BM 59 is capable of selective fire.

The BM 59 was adopted in 1959 and served with Italian, Argentinian, Indonesian, and Moroccan armies. In the early 1980s, semi-automatic versions were imported to the United States and sold to private collectors. The earliest BM 59s were manufactured from U.S.-manufactured M1 parts, including re-chambered barrels.

Beginning in 1990, the BM 59 was replaced in Italian service by the Beretta AR70/90 assault rifles, although some may be in service in the Italian Navy.

Variants
The BM 59 has several military and civilian variants that include the following:

Military
BM 59 Mark I: had a wooden stock with a semi-pistol grip stock.
BM 59 Mark II: had a wooden stock with pistol grip to achieve a better control during full-auto fire;
BM 59 Mark III: or Ital TA (also known as the Truppe Alpine), was a variant with a pistol grip and a metallic folding buttstock, that was intended for mountain troops. The BM 59 Para was similar to BM 59 Ital TA, but was intended for paratroopers. It was equipped with a shorter barrel and flash-hider.
BM 59 Mark IV: had a heavier barrel with a plastic stock, and was used as a light squad automatic weapon.

Civilian
The rare BM62 and 69 are civilian sporting rifles with the grenade launcher and sights removed. with the following:
BM62: Semi-auto chambered in .308 Winchester (commercial variant of 7.62×51mm NATO), came with 20-round magazines, civilian flash hider (no bayonet lug, no grenade launcher, no tri-compensator (extremely rare to have gas cylinder with bipod capability)  Does not normally have bipod capability on gas cylinder, or gas-compensator
BM69: Semi-auto with a bipod and tri-compensator.

Users

: Used in the Falklands War.

: Some ex-Nigerian Army rifles

: Built Under license at the Bandung Weapons Factory as the SP-1 (BM 59 Mk I), SP-2 (BM 59 Mk I with rifle grenade system) and SP-3 (BM 59 Mk IV).

: Built under license
: Under license by Defense Industries Corporation in Kaduna. Adopted by Nigerian Army in 1963.

See also
M14 rifle
MAS-49
Mini-14

References

7.62×51mm NATO semi-automatic rifles
7.62×51mm NATO battle rifles
BM 59
Rifles of the Cold War
Rifles of Italy
Military equipment introduced in the 1950s